Nagarchal may refer to:
 Nagarchal language, an unattested language formerly spoken in parts of central India
 Nagarchal dialect, a dialect of the Dhundari language of Rajasthan, India
 Nagarchal region, a subregion of Dhundhar in Rajasthan, India, centred on the town of Nagar